Charl du Toit (born 26 March 1993) is a South African former Paralympic sprinter who competed in the T37 class. Du Toit has competed at two Summer Paralympic Games, London 2012 and Rio 2016. At the 2016 Summer Olympics he won gold medals in the 100 metre and 400 metre races, setting a world record in the latter.

Personal history
Du Toit was born in Pretoria, South Africa in 1993. He has cerebral palsy. Du Toit was educated at Hoërskool Akasia in his home city. After matriculating from high school he attended Stellenbosch University.

References

External links 
 

1993 births
Afrikaner people
Living people
Paralympic athletes of South Africa
Athletes (track and field) at the 2012 Summer Paralympics
Paralympic gold medalists for South Africa
World record holders in Paralympic athletics
Medalists at the 2016 Summer Paralympics
Athletes (track and field) at the 2016 Summer Paralympics
Sportspeople from Pretoria
South African male sprinters
Commonwealth Games medallists in athletics
Commonwealth Games bronze medallists for South Africa
Athletes (track and field) at the 2014 Commonwealth Games
Paralympic medalists in athletics (track and field)
Athletes (track and field) at the 2020 Summer Paralympics
Medallists at the 2014 Commonwealth Games